Linha de Évora  is a railway line in Portugal, which connects Casa Branca and Évora.

See also 
 List of railway lines in Portugal
 List of Portuguese locomotives and railcars
 History of rail transport in Portugal

Sources
 

Railway lines in Portugal
Iberian gauge railways